Enlightened may refer to:
 Enlightened (TV series), an American comedy-drama
 Enlightened (album), 2007, by Dynamic Duo
 The Enlightened, a faction in Ingress (video game)

See also
 Enlightened self-interest, a philosophy in ethics
 Enlightenment (disambiguation)